"Futility" is a poem written by Wilfred Owen, one of the most renowned poets of World War I. The poem was written in May 1918 and published as no. 153 in The Complete Poems and Fragments. The poem is well known for its departure from Owen's famous style of including disturbing and graphic images in his work; the poem instead has a more soothing, somewhat light-hearted feel to it in comparison. A previous secretary of the Wilfred Owen Association argues that the bitterness in Owen's other poems "gives place to the pity that characterises his finest work". Futility details an event where a group of soldiers attempts to revive an unconscious soldier by moving him into the warm sunlight on a snowy meadow. However, the "kind old sun" cannot help the soldier - he has died.

The titular theme of the poem is claimed to be common to many World War I and World War II war poets and to apply not only to war, but human institutions (including religion) and human existence itself. Noting the "religious" nature of the poem's questioning, academics C.B.Cox and A.E. Dyson claim that "Futility" is a "poetic equivalent...to the famous Tomb in Westminster Abbey."

Depictions in popular culture
In 1982, singer Virginia Astley set Futility to music she had composed; the track was included on an NME compilation cassette in October 1982 (credited as The Ravishing Beauties) and on Virginia Astley's 1983 album Promise Nothing. The poem is among those set in the War Requiem of Benjamin Britten.

References

External links

 

World War I poems
British poems
Poetry by Wilfred Owen